Loesenera kalantha is a species of large shrub to medium size tree in the family Fabaceae. It is found in Côte d'Ivoire and Liberia.

References

Detarioideae
Flora of Ivory Coast
Flora of Liberia
Trees of Africa
Vulnerable plants
Taxonomy articles created by Polbot